Vera Farmiga is an American actress, director, and producer. She garnered worldwide acclaim for her role in the 2009 film Up in the Air. This role earned Farmiga nominations for the Academy Award for Best Supporting Actress, the Golden Globe Award for Best Supporting Actress – Motion Picture, the BAFTA Award for Best Actress in a Supporting Role and the Screen Actors Guild Award for Outstanding Performance by a Female Actor in a Supporting Role, as well as many other nominations. In 2011, she made her directing debut with the acclaimed drama film Higher Ground, for which she received multiple award nominations, including the Gotham Award for Best Breakthrough Director and the Satellite Award for Best Actress.

From 2013 to 2017, she starred in the A&E television series Bates Motel as Norma Louise Bates. Her performance in the role has earned her a Saturn Award for Best Actress on Television (2013) and a People's Choice Award (2016), and nominations for the Primetime Emmy Award for Outstanding Lead Actress in a Drama Series (2013), the Satellite Award for Best Actress – Television Series Drama (2013), the TCA Award for Individual Achievement in Drama (2013), and the Critics' Choice Television Award for Best Actress in a Drama Series (20132015). In 2019, Farmiga portrayed prosecutor Elizabeth Lederer in the acclaimed Netflix miniseries When They See Us. For her performance, she received a nomination for the Primetime Emmy Award for Outstanding Supporting Actress in a Limited Series or Movie.

Major awards

Academy Awards

BAFTA Awards

Golden Globe Awards

Primetime Emmy Awards

Screen Actors Guild Awards

Critics' awards

Boston Society of Film Critics Awards

Chicago Film Critics Association Awards

Critics' Choice Awards

Dallas–Fort Worth Film Critics Association Awards

Denver Film Critics Society Awards

Detroit Film Critics Society Awards

Dublin Film Critics' Circle Awards

Houston Film Critics Society Awards

London Film Critics' Circle Awards

Los Angeles Film Critics Association Awards

National Board of Review Awards

National Society of Film Critics Awards

New York Film Critics Circle Awards

Online Film Critics Society Awards

San Diego Film Critics Society Awards

St. Louis Gateway Film Critics Association Awards

Television Critics Association Awards

Toronto Film Critics Association Awards

Vancouver Film Critics Circle Awards

Washington D.C. Area Film Critics Association Awards

Other awards

Alliance of Women Film Journalists Awards

BendFilm Festival Awards

Boston Film Festival Awards

British Independent Film Awards

Dorian Awards

Empire Awards

Fangoria Chainsaw Awards

Gopo Awards

Gotham Awards

Gracie Awards

Independent Spirit Awards

Marrakech International Film Festival Awards

MTV Movie Awards

People's Choice Awards

Provincetown International Film Festival Awards

Qantas Film and Television Awards

Santa Barbara International Film Festival Awards

Satellite Awards

Saturn Awards

Sundance Film Festival Awards

Village Voice Film Poll Awards

Women's Image Network Awards

Notes

 A  Shared with Anthony Anderson, Alec Baldwin, Matt Damon, Leonardo DiCaprio, Jack Nicholson, Martin Sheen, Mark Wahlberg, and Ray Winstone.
 B  Shared with Jason Bateman, George Clooney, Sam Elliott, Zach Galifianakis, Anna Kendrick, Melanie Lynskey, Danny McBride, Amy Morton, and J. K. Simmons.
 C  Tied with Kate Dollenmayer for Funny Ha Ha.
 D  Originally titled The Vintner's Luck.
 E  Honored alongside Peter Sarsgaard, Christoph Waltz, and Stanley Tucci.

See also
 Vera Farmiga on screen and stage

References

External links
 
 
 

Farmiga, Vera